Elke Büdenbender (born 14 January 1962) is a German jurist, and, since 1995, the wife of Frank-Walter Steinmeier, the current President of Germany.

Early life 
Büdenbender attended intermediate secondary school in Siegen, after which she trained as an industrial clerk at a company in the machine building industry in Siegen. In 1982 she attended Siegerland College in Siegen and then worked as a clerk at a logistics company. In 1985, she began her degree in law at Justus Liebig University in Giessen, where she passed her first state law examination in 1991.

Career 
From 1987, Büdenbender worked as a student assistant and later as a research assistant to Professor Brun-Otto Bryde at the Chair of Public Law. She completed her practical legal training at Hanover Regional Court in 1994, when she passed her second state law examination. 

Thereafter, Büdenbender worked as a judge at Hanover Administrative Court. She has been a judge at Berlin Administrative Court since 2000. She is currently on long-term leave in order to devote her time to being the first lady.

Other activities 
 German-Israeli Future Forum, Member of the Board of Trustees

Personal life 
In 1995 Büdenbender married Frank-Walter Steinmeier, who was elected as the twelfth President of the Federal Republic of Germany on 12 February 2017. They have one daughter. On 24 August 2010, she received a kidney transplant that was donated to her by her husband.

Honours

Foreign Honours
 : Dame Grand Cross of the Order of the Dannebrog (19 November 2021)
 : Grand Cross of the Order of the White Rose of Finland (17 September 2018)
 : Grand Cross of the Order of the Falcon (16 June 2019)
 : Grand Cross of the Order of Merit of the Italian Republic (17 September 2019)
 : Commander Grand Cross of the Order of the Three Stars (19 February 2019)
 : Dame Grand Cross of the Order of the Crown (5 July 2021)
 : Dame Grand Cross of the Order of Isabella the Catholic (11 October 2022)
 : Commander Grand Cross of the Royal Order of the Polar Star (7 September 2021)

References

1962 births
Living people
Spouses of presidents of Germany
German women judges
Frank-Walter Steinmeier
University of Giessen alumni
Grand Crosses of the Order of the Dannebrog
Order of the White Rose of Finland
Knights Grand Cross of the Order of the Falcon
Knights Grand Cross of the Order of Merit of the Italian Republic
Recipients of the Order of the Three Stars
Grand Crosses of the Order of the Crown (Netherlands)
Commanders Grand Cross of the Order of the Polar Star
Dames Grand Cross of the Order of Isabella the Catholic